The 2015–16 Ram Slam T20 Challenge was the thirteenth season of the Ram Slam T20 Challenge, established by Cricket South Africa. The tournament was previously known as the MiWay T20 Challenge and the Standard Bank Pro20 Series. The tournament was played between 1 November and 12 December 2015. Titans won the tournament beating Dolphins by 3 wickets in the final.

Squads

Fixtures

Group stage

Knockout stage
Semi-final

Final

References

External links
 Tournament home at ESPN Cricinfo

South African domestic cricket competitions
Ram Slam T20 Challenge
2015–16 South African cricket season